Rajiv Dabhadkar (born 12 March 1968) is a Technocrat. He is a resident of Panchgani,in Maharashtra. At present, he is the CEO and Founder of "National Organization for Software and Technology Professionals", which came into existence in April 2004 and has been involved in a knowledge (tech) worker advocacy organisation with a focus on wage discrimination and worker rights issues.
He returned to India, after staying more than a decade in The Americas, to begin The National Organization for Software and Technology Professionals (NOSTOPS).

He began with the objective of changing the perception of the Indian knowledge workers working overseas, especially in the United States. Wage discrimination and abuse of the guest workers rights has primarily been the focus area communicated via many of his commissioned media initiatives.

He has been advocating reforms towards the foreign guest worker issues in The Americas and has been interacting with domain experts, key stakeholders and final policymakers of the H-1B & L visa program on the Capitol Hill in the United States. He has testified to the judiciary committee on Immigration in early 2007, made contributions to the proposal draft for guest knowledge worker reforms leading to the drafting of the 'Visa Fraud and Abuse Prevention Act of 2007' bill proposal that aimed to prevent visa misuse, document fraud and abuse of guestworker rights in the immigration process.

His research work has been cited by the UK Border Agency as well as the US Homeland Security.

He has effectively communicated his research findings with key American tech worker organizations and a series of media initiatives were commissioned jointly to bring awareness to the issues of bypassing local talent and creating segregation of workers both foreign guest workers as well as local citizens US Tech Workers groups boycott IBM, Infosys and ManpowerVisa fraud in US tech industry relies on falsified job letters

His liaisoning with the US Department of Labor, and the US Department of Justice Officials to provide evidence of visa misuse has helped identify and document misuse of the work visa programs, necessary in providing evidence of visa scamming and those that are misusing the "system loopholes" and gaming the system.

In early 2004, Rajiv brought the concept of ‘dual employment' in focus, which creates entrapment of foreign guest workers in labor bondage with their work visa sponsoring American employers and serving an involuntary servitude.

In early 2005, He brought forth the issue of how work visa petitioning employers manipulated the prevailing wages for foreign workers and received approvals that allowed them to underpay foreign workers and bypass hiring local citizens. He also put forward the issue of 'dual taxation' and the anomalies via the Totalization Agreement  : A glimmer of hope for Indian techies in US.

He works with the Indian Ministry of External Affairs and the Indian Missions abroad on assisting and repatriating ‘stranded’ Indian Citizens abroad that are victims of employer related abuse.

He advises companies on immigration and global mobility and mentors technology Start-ups at the Dept of Science and Technology backed Technology Business Incubators. He helps International Universities looking for a presence in India and Indian Start-ups in their cross cultural, cross border marketing, brand promotion and PR strategy in India and overseas.

Early life and education 
Rajiv Dabhadkar has studied in General Education Academy. He has earned a Master of Science (MS) in Computer Science from Monmouth University Political Science and Sociology Department and has lived in the United States of America and has an MBA from Saint Peter's University, He has stayed for 12 years before returning to India to begin ‘The National Organisation for Software and Technology Professionals (NOSTOPS)’ in April 2004.

Publication 
 Green Carrot - Americas Work Visa Crisis
  American Work Permit – Official Rules & Regulations of American Work Visa
 Americanisms - A Guide to the BPO Industr

Recognition 
 UN Karmaveer Chakra Awardee (Samvidhan Divas - 2014 & 2019)

Initiatives

NOSTOPS 
 NOSTOPS founded in April 2004.
 Joined hands with Bright Future Jobs as an American lobbying partner to end the xenophobic anti-guest worker sentiments.
 NOSTOPS members participated in media interviews to bring forth instances of abuse and involuntary servitude amongst guest workers.
 Exposed employer contractual bondage and the related visa scamming abuse.

PROVE 
 PROVE - Professional Registry of Verified Employees (www.proveit.in) was launched on October 2, 2015 with an aim to Arrest the rampant global labor fraud. PROVE is a property of NOSTOPS.
 PROVE was started with an aim to create an Open Registry for Verified Employees to fill in the gap between Verified Knowledge Worker and genuine foreign Employer.

INDIAVERIFIED

In January 2017, NOSTOPS had launched an initiative, Indiaverified, that served as an online databank of live, verified and screened knowledge workers, which employers could use to query and authenticate prospective employees to file their work visa petition. The initiative aimed to Verify, Qualify and Promote the knowledge workers to employers globally.

Reference list 

American people of Indian descent
American businesspeople